A beauty YouTuber, commonly referred to as a "beauty vlogger", "beauty guru", or  "beauty influencer," is a person who creates and posts videos to YouTube about cosmetics, fashion, hairstyling, nail art, and other beauty-related topics. As of 2016, there were more than 5.3 million beauty videos on YouTube, and 86 percent of the top 200 beauty videos were made by beauty vloggers as opposed to beauty brands.

Background and industry trends
As of 2015, YouTube counted more than 45,000 YouTube channels specializing in fashion and beauty-related content.

While few have been credited as pioneers in this industry, there have been dozens of Beauty influencers to arise since. With billions of views on beauty-related videos, and an average of 700 million views per month in 2013. In 2015, 45.3 billion views on these YouTube videos were recorded.

In the United Kingdom, beauty vlogging is a rapidly-growing industry that attracts 700 million views per month.

Impact
Beauty YouTubers often provide viewers with life advice while disclosing stories about personal experiences. They might also share their positive and negative encounters with certain beauty products through trial-and-error, and/or demonstrate how to perform particular techniques in order to achieve specific makeup looks. While giving this information, these channels also provide a forum for feedback.

According to the article journal of University of Calgary, one of the most popular categories of video is “Get Ready With Me's" (often shortened to the acronym "GRWM"). These videos showcase how beauty YouTubers get ready for certain occasions, what is happening in their day-to-day life and show their daily rituals, whether it be a trip to the mall, special event, or even to just to go to bed. This format combines elements of a tutorial and the vlogger's routine.

Besides creating videos, beauty YouTubers typically take part in media events such as BeautyCon and Vidcon.

Video styles and equipment 
Through these vlogger's YouTube channels, various playlists can be found where all beauty-related content is divided into specific subcategories in respect to its distinct features. These subcategories include but are not limited to:
 Tutorials, which demonstrate the use of makeup or hair products.
 Some tutorials, but not all, may be based on a specific theme (e.g. holidays, seasonal, etc.)
 Makeup routines for a specific look.
 "Get Ready With Me" videos.
 Fashion routine videos for a specific outfit, or "lookbooks".
 Favorites or haul videos, which discuss the vlogger's recently purchased or acquired makeup products.
 Anti-hauls, which discuss the vlogger's dislike for certain makeup products.
 Product reviews for makeup and hair products.
 Commentary and gossip, colloquially referred to in the community as "tea" or "drama".
 Vlogs.
 Q&A or "chit-chat" videos about the vlogger's personal life.

A beauty vlogger's video may fit one or more of these categories. The medium does not require much in the way of expensive equipment or technological proficiency compared to traditional media. The most basic videos require only a computer with a webcam, an Internet connection, and basic editing software such as iMovie. The accessibility of the means to produce a vlog has contributed to the popularity and widespread production of videos in this format.

Notable beauty YouTubers
Shown below is a table showing the YouTubers with the most subscribers.

The Shorty Awards have honored several beauty YouTubers in the "YouTube Guru" category. Recipients of this award include American YouTuber Michelle Phan in 2015; British YouTuber Louise Pentland, popularly known as Sprinkle of Glitter, in 2016; NikkieTutorials in 2017 and James Charles in 2018.

See also
List of YouTubers
YouTuber
Instagram models
Fashion influencer
Outfit of the day

References

 Beauty YouTuber